Scream of the Shalka is a Flash-animated series based on the British science fiction television series Doctor Who. It was produced to coincide with the 40th anniversary of the series and was originally released in six weekly parts from 13 November to 18 December 2003 on bbc.co.uk's Doctor Who website.

Although Scream of the Shalka continues the narrative of the original 1963–89 programme and the 1996 television film, the show's 2005 revival ignored its events. The series was written by veteran Doctor Who writer Paul Cornell, with Richard E. Grant providing the voice for the Ninth Doctor. This performance followed years of rumours that Grant would play the Doctor in a film or new series, and indeed he had appeared as the "Conceited Doctor" in the Comic Relief special Doctor Who and the Curse of Fatal Death in 1999. Grant subsequently went on to appear in the revived television series of Doctor Who as Walter Simeon and the Great Intelligence in 2012's "The Snowmen" and 2013's "The Bells of Saint John" and "The Name of the Doctor". The Doctor's companion for this adventure, Alison Cheney, was voiced by Sophie Okonedo who a year later would be nominated for an Academy Award for her performance in Hotel Rwanda. She also appeared in the 2010 series of Doctor Who, as Liz Ten, in the episodes "The Beast Below" and "The Pandorica Opens". Derek Jacobi reprised his role as the Master in 2007's "Utopia". David Tennant appeared in a cameo role as the Caretaker, later being cast as the Tenth Doctor in 2005.

Plot
The TARDIS materialises in the village of Lannet in Lancashire.  An annoyed Doctor, who has apparently been transported here against his will, is locked out of the TARDIS and forced to examine his surroundings. After determining he is in England in 2003, he is surprised to discover the village is silent and the inhabitants all living in fear except for a barmaid named Alison Cheney. After the patrons and bar owner refuse to tell the Doctor what's going on, he leaves the bar and stumbles upon a lava statue and a homeless woman who is frightened.  As the woman is beginning to fill in the Doctor on what's been happening, a tremor strikes the area and the woman is killed by a mysterious force.  Back at the TARDIS, the ground opens up and the Doctor's police box is swallowed up into the lava below.  Angered at the homeless woman's death, the Doctor tracks down Alison and her boyfriend Joe at their home and breaks in demanding that someone tell him what has been going on.  Alison tells the Doctor that three weeks ago, strange noises began coming from underground.  She has seen mysterious aliens around town watching her.  The townspeople have convinced themselves that they need to stay indoors and make as little noise as possible.  The Doctor begins making noise to attract the aliens, who burst up through the floor in a pool of lava.  Immune to their shrieking cries, he deflects their noises back at them causing them to explode.  The Doctor, Alison, and Joe flee next door where the Doctor explains that the aliens have bodies that can remake themselves.  He improvises a large explosion which he believes will disable them and buy time.  The explosion destroys the two alien worms and causes the noises from the ground to stop.

The Doctor contacts UNIT and explains that he is not interested in getting involved in this problem.  He gives them all the information he has on the aliens and tells them that once he retrieves his TARDIS he is leaving.  The aliens have begun nesting below ground at a site rich with a special volcanic rock the Doctor believes they have adapted themselves to use.  He maps out the area and leads a UNIT team down into some caves to find his TARDIS.  After a tense exchange with the UNIT commander, the worm creatures attack and the Doctor separates himself from the group and hitches a ride in a giant underground worm to the main lair of the aliens.  There he meets Prime, commander of the Shalka.  Prime declares humans inferior and subject to their domination.  The Doctor attempts to act inept to extract information from Prime, who sees through the act and calls him out on it.  Prime reveals that the Shalka are 2000 strong and will be invading the surface soon.  The Doctor attempts another bluff, declaring himself a non-human and therefore uninterested in what happens to the humans.  Prime orders Alison executed in hot lava, which forces the Doctor to make a deal to spare her life. He allows the Shalka into the TARDIS and de-activates the Master, who turns out to be an android programmed by the Doctor.  The Shalka tell the Doctor his technology is inferior and they do not need him.  He is cast into a black hole they have created inside Earth that they are using as a gateway to bring in more troops and also to dispose of people they do not need.  As he is plummeting into the black hole the Doctor realizes his phone is still connected to the TARDIS and uses it to summon the TARDIS.  He finds the Master re-activated and forcefully expels the Shalka from the TARDIS into the black hole.  For an unknown reason, the Shalka release Alison back to the surface.

As UNIT evacuates the town, a soldier tells the Doctor he has captured one of the Shalka on the surface.  The Shalka was accidentally exposed to raw oxygen when a cylinder near it exploded.  The raw oxygen caused it to pass out.  The Doctor also discovers that Alison is alive, and that none of the survivors from the town have made it to their new destinations.  The Doctor attempts to interrogate the Shalka but it recovers and attacks the soldier.  The Doctor uses more oxygen to subdue it until he can determine what's going on.  He also discovers that the survivors all have sore throats.  The survivors and Alison all march against their will to a warehouse in another town.  The Doctor arrives in his TARDIS with UNIT men inside and they storm the area.  The Doctor removes a living Shalka from Alison's forehead but the effort causes him to pass out.  When he recovers they find that all around the world people are mobilizing against their will to strategic points on Earth.  The Doctor realizes that the reason everyone has a sore throat is that they all have been emitting subsonic screams when under Shalka control.  The Shalka are using the screams to alter the atmosphere of the Earth.  As the slaves begin emitting their screams and the ozone layer of the Earth is being stripped away the Doctor takes Alison and the Master back to the Shalka underground lair.  When asked if the Master is coming with them, the Doctor tells Alison that the Master cannot leave the TARDIS.  The Doctor and Alison confront Prime, who tells them that the Shalka inhabit 80% of the worlds in the universe, living underground off of volcanic energy.  When a species is on the edge of ecological destruction, the Shalka come in and finish destroying the planet.  The rest of the universe assumes that the species that died off did the damage to themselves, and the Shalka live underground in the remains of that world.

The Doctor swallows the small piece of Shalka he removed from Alison's forehead.  He bonds with it, reprogramming it to do what he wants.  He uses its knowledge to plug himself into their sonic network and understand the shrieks.  He engages Prime in a "sonic duel", which he purposely throws to get Prime to move him toward the black hole controls.  He activates the black hole, sucking in Prime and sending her to her death.  Alison stops the black hole and the Doctor coughs up the piece of Shalka.  He puts it back in Alison's head, where she fights off the remaining Shalka and shuts down the screams.  The Doctor unplugs her a few moments before she can reprogram the scream to heal the atmosphere.  He tells her that she cannot be allowed that much power.  On board the TARDIS, the Master reveals that it has been a long time since the Doctor had a living companion.  His last companion was killed in the events that also led to the Master choosing to have his consciousness placed in the android and to the Doctor's exile.  Without being specific, the Master tells her that they are being controlled by an unknown force and the Doctor wants Alison to stay as his companion but he won't ask her to.  After they land, Joe arrives and Alison tells him she is leaving with the Doctor because she is bored and wants to see the universe.  Joe reluctantly accepts her decision and a kiss before the Master begins the TARDIS dematerialising cycle and they board the craft.

Production
Doctor Who had suspended production in 1989, and aside from charity specials had only resurfaced as an American-funded television movie in 1996, which did not garner enough ratings to go to a regular series. When Shalka was announced in July 2003 for planned broadcast in November, the possibility of Doctor Who returning to television screens still seemed remote and BBC Worldwide were continuing to shop around for another possible movie deal. As a result, BBCi officially announced, with BBC approval, that the Doctor appearing in Shalka would be the Ninth Doctor. However, events rapidly overtook this.

In September Lorraine Heggessey, the Controller of BBC One, managed to persuade BBC Worldwide that as their plans for a Doctor Who film were nowhere near fruition, BBC Television should be allowed to make a new series. A deal with Russell T Davies to produce the new series was quickly struck, and on 26 September, the BBC announced that Doctor Who would be returning to BBC One in 2005, produced by BBC Wales. As a result, the status of the Shalka webcast was in doubt even before it was released.

After the webcast, in February 2004, plans for sequels were indefinitely shelved. For a period, it was unclear if the new television Doctor would be the Ninth or Tenth Doctor, but this was ultimately settled in April 2004 when in an interview with Doctor Who Magazine, Davies announced that the new television Doctor (played by Christopher Eccleston), would be the Ninth Doctor, relegating Grant's Doctor to an alternate Doctor. Davies later commented that Grant had never been considered for the role in the television series, telling Doctor Who Magazine: "I thought he was terrible. I thought he took the money and ran, to be honest. It was a lazy performance. He was never on our list to play the Doctor."

The working title for this production was Servants of the Shalakor. This original story outline is included in the BBC Books novelization (see below).

In print

The novelization of Shalka was written by Paul Cornell. The book also includes a feature on the making of the webcast, as well as the original Servants of the Shalakor story outline.

Critical analysis 
A book length study of the serial, written by Jon Arnold, was published as part of The Black Archive series from Obverse Books in 2017.  This  detailed the story's key points and the production process, and featured an in depth look at the unmade sequel story Blood of the Robots. This book also revealed that the Big Finish audio drama Immortal Beloved was originally intended as a Shalka sequel before being adapted to feature the Eighth Doctor.

DVD release
The British Board of Film Classification cleared all six episodes of the series for release on DVD. In March 2007, clips from the series were released to DVD, as part of Flash Frames, a documentary on the DVD release of the restored The Invasion. The story was released on DVD in Region 2 on 16 September 2013.

References

External links

Webcast
 Scream of the Shalka, on the BBC website
 
 Scream of the Shalka theme music

Novelization
 The Cloister Library – Scream of the Shalka (novelization)

Reviews

2004 British novels
2004 science fiction novels
Fiction set in 2003
Novels set in the 2000s
Novels set in Lancashire
Webcasts based on Doctor Who
Novels based on Doctor Who
Novels by Paul Cornell
The Master (Doctor Who) stories
The Master (Doctor Who) novels
British drama web series
Past Doctor Adventures
Doctor Who
Doctor Who DVD covers